Bunchberry is a common name for several species of dwarf dogwoods:

Cornus canadensis - Canadian or eastern bunchberry
Cornus suecica - Eurasian or northern bunchberry
Cornus × unalaschkensis - Alaskan or western bunchberry

Cornus